Shahsavari may refer to:
 Shahsavari, East Azerbaijan
 Shahsavari, Kohgiluyeh and Boyer-Ahmad

See also
 Shahsavar (disambiguation)